

Winners

See also
 Bollywood
 Cinema of India
 Screen Awards

References

Screen Awards